The Drummondville City Council (in French: Conseil municipal de Drummondville) is the governing body for the mayor–council government in the city of Drummondville, Quebec in the Centre-du-Québec region. The council consists of the mayor and 12 councillors.

Current Drummondville City Council 
Alain Carrier, mayor
Dominic Martin, District 1 councillor
M. Jean Charest, District 2 councillor
Catherine Lassonde, District 3 councillor
Alain D'Auteuil, District 4 councillor
John Husk, District 5 councillor
William Morales, District 6 councillor
Alain Martel, District 7 councillor
Yves Grondin, District 8 councillor
Annick Bellavance, District 9 councillor
Stéphanie Lacoste, District 10 councillor
Daniel Pelletier, District 11 councillor
Cathy Bernier, District 12 councillor

See also 
List of mayors of Drummondville

References

External links 
 Drummonville City Council 

Municipal councils in Quebec
Drummondville